Oliver Wilkes (born 2 May 1980) is a former Scotland international rugby League footballer who played as a  and  in the 1990s, 2000s and 2010s.

He has played for the Sheffield Eagles, Huddersfield Giants, Keighley Cougars, Leigh Centurions (two spells), Whitehaven, Wigan Warriors, Widnes Vikings, Wakefield Trinity Wildcats (two spells), Harlequins RL, Barrow Raiders and Workington Town.

Background
Wilkes was born in Ulverston, Lancashire, England.

Playing career

Sheffield Eagles
Wilkes began his career at Sheffield Eagles, making his Super League début as an 18-year-old in 1998.

Huddersfield Giants
He also played in Super League for Huddersfield Giants.

Keighley Cougars
He then join the Keighley Cougars in the Northern Ford Premiership.

Leigh Centurions
He then spent time at Leigh Centurions, featuring for them in Super League in 2005.

Wigan Warriors
He briefly returned to Super League with Wigan Warriors in 2006. In 2022, Wilkes admitted that he had taken performance-enhancing drugs at his previous club, Whitehaven, prior to his to move to Wigan.

Widnes Vikings
His next move was to the Widnes Vikings. He played for Widnes Vikings in the 2006 National League Grand Final. After the season, he required reconstructive shoulder surgery. In 2007, he scored 15 tries in 34 games with Widnes Vikings before returning to Super League with Wakefield Trinity Wildcats the following year.

Wakefield Trinity Wildcats
He returned to the Super League with Wakefield Trinity Wildcatsin 2007.

Wilkes was a consistent feature within the 2009 Wakefield Trinity Wildcats squad, and they managed to secure a fifth-place finish within the Super League reaching the play-offs.

Harlequins Rugby League
He then moved to Harlequins RL, spending two years there before returning to Wakefield Trinity Wildcats.

Wakefield Trinity Wildcats
Wilkes rejoined Wakefield Trinity Wildcats in 2012.

Leigh
Wilkes left Wakefield Trinity Wildcats to rejoin Leigh in 2014, captained the side Leigh to the League Leaders' Shield, and the Championship Grand Final victory. At the end of the 2015 season, he announced he was leaving Leigh to sign for his hometown club Barrow.

Barrow Raiders
Wilkes left the Barrow Raiders after spending the 2016 and 2017 seasons at the League 1 club.

Workington Town
Wilkes joined Workington Town ahead of the 2018 season.
He was named club captain for the 2018 season, he played for town for 2 years making 43 appearances and scoring 18 tries, Wilkes announced his retirement in August 2019.

International career
He was named to the Scotland training squad for the 2008 Rugby League World Cup and was named to the full Scotland squad for the 2008 Rugby League World Cup. He scored the winning try over Fiji in Scotland's first ever World Cup win. Wilkes was recalled to the Scotland squad in 2018, at the age of 38, for the European championships.

References

External links

Workington Town profile
 (archived by web.archive.org) Harlequins profile
 (archived by web.archive.org) Wakefield Trinity Wildcats profile
 (archived by web.archive.org) Widnes Profile
 (archived by web.archive.org) Wigan Profile

1980 births
Living people
Barrow Raiders players
English people of Scottish descent
English rugby league players
Huddersfield Giants players
Keighley Cougars players
Leigh Leopards captains
Leigh Leopards players
London Broncos players
Rugby league locks
Rugby league players from Ulverston
Rugby league props
Rugby league second-rows
Scotland national rugby league team captains
Scotland national rugby league team players
Sheffield Eagles (1984) players
Wakefield Trinity players
Whitehaven R.L.F.C. players
Widnes Vikings players
Wigan Warriors players
Workington Town players